Vexillum bangertarum is a species of sea snail, a marine gastropod mollusk, in the family Costellariidae, the ribbed miters.

Distribution
This marine species occurs off the Philippines.

References

 Herrmann, M. (2019). A new sister species of Vexillum cookorum (Turner, Gori & Salisbury, 2007) (Gastropoda: Costellariidae) from the Philippines. Acta Conchyliorum. 18: 95–101.

External links

bangertarum
Gastropods described in 2019